Tabebuia platyantha is a species of plant in the Bignoniaceae family. It is endemic to Jamaica.

References

platyantha
Near threatened plants
Endemic flora of Jamaica
Taxonomy articles created by Polbot